Primitive Instinct ("PI") are an English progressive/classic rock band, formed in 1987 in Maidstone, Kent, England, by guitarist/vocalist/songwriter Nick Sheridan, who still fronts the band today. To the uninitiated, a ballpark description of PI would be modern-day Marillion meets Pink Floyd. Importantly though, PI have developed their own distinctive and individual approach, thus ensuring their own sound.

History
Formed in 1987, the original line-up consisted of Nick Sheridan (guitar and vocals), Andy Quinnel (keyboards), Billy Geddes (bass), Nick Brown (guitar) and Richard Culham (drums). In the late 1980s and early 1990s, they gigged constantly, building up an ever-increasing fan base in the south-east of England, later to spread around Great Britain and abroad. During this period they released four cassette-only fan albums (A Primitive Instinct, Once Round Your Ear, On A Rainy Night and Into The Ocean). The early 1990s heralded the arrival of bassist "Pic" Hayes, who remains today, as the nucleus of the band with Sheridan. Nick Brown also left the band around the same time.

In 1994, PI secured a deal with Cyclops Records, releasing their first CD album, Floating Tangibility. Meeting with widespread critical acclaim from all quarters it sold several thousand copies with very little promotion. The 1990s saw them securing support slots with the likes of IQ, Pendragon, and John Wetton, with the latter musician being particularly impressed by their live show. Richard Culham was replaced by Chris Brown (drums) in 1995. In a similar manner to Tom Scholz of Boston, principal songwriter Sheridan does not rush to follow up albums, and to stem the demand from fans waiting for a follow up to Floating Tangibility, PI released a cherry-picked selection of early demos as "Ice For Eskimos" in 1998. Andy Quinnell left to pursue a career in banking leaving PI to continue as a three-piece.

Belief
A new album proved to be worth the long wait for it, when in 2000 PI released Belief. Setting the benchmark for future releases by the band, it combines great songwriting, memorable choruses and a sense of the epic. The early "Noughties" saw PI promoting Belief extensively with gigs across the UK and Europe, and the Belief album received many excellent reviews and much critical acclaim from across the world. 

In 2005 Chris Brown left to run a diving centre in Florida and was replaced on drums by long-term fan Stuart Bailey.

25th anniversary

On 3 November 2012 Primitive Instinct performed a special show in their home town to coincide with their 25th anniversary. The gig was a big success, with many past members of PI joining the current line-up on stage. The show was also filmed for possible future release.

One Man's Refuge

The 25th-anniversary gig also marked the released of their long-awaited new album One Man's Refuge. After just one review  orders for the new album are coming in from across the world, including Japan, Russia, Israel, US and across Europe.

Current status

Along with Nick, bassist Pic has been with the band some 25 years now and, with the Jonathan Vincent on Keyboards and newest member Simon Harrisson on drums, they truly are an awesome foursome. The last few years has seen the boys play shows with Wishbone Ash, Stray, The Yardbirds and Karnataka. A few years back John Wetton was highly impressed with the live act – high praise indeed. Primitive Instinct are currently recording the follow up to One Man's Refuge for release in 2018.

Current members
 Nick Sheridan, guitar, keyboards and vocals
 Pic Hayes, bass and vocals
 Simon Harrison, drums
 Jonathan Vincent, keyboards and vocals

Previous members
 Andy Quinnell, keyboards
 Richard Culham, drums
 Nick Brown, lead guitar
 Graham McGarrick, drums
 Billy Geddes, bass
 Richard Chater, bass
 Stuart Bailey, drums
 Chris Brown, drums

References

External links
Official website

English progressive rock groups